The Sugg Clinic is considered an outstanding example of the Streamline Moderne architectural style.  The building, which is listed in the National Register of Historic Places, is located at 100 E 13th Street in Ada, Oklahoma.  Opened in 1947, it was called "one of the best equipped clinics in the Southwest."  Architect Albert S. Ross designed it to fulfill Dr. Alfred R. Sugg's dream of a large, modern clinic to serve the growing city.  The Sugg Clinic features smooth tile walls, curved corners, glass block windows, and brushed aluminum trim.  The clinic closed in 1980.  After a period of vacancy, it was later restored as an office building.

References

External links

http://www.archiplanet.org/wiki/Sugg_Clinic

Hospital buildings on the National Register of Historic Places in Oklahoma
Streamline Moderne architecture in Oklahoma
Buildings and structures in Pontotoc County, Oklahoma
Ada, Oklahoma
National Register of Historic Places in Pontotoc County, Oklahoma